The motherland controversy ( or shortly) happened in 1936 in Taiwan, then under the colonial rule of Japan. Lin Hsien-tang, the chief of the family of Lin from Wufeng, Taiwan, was openly humiliated by a Japanese gangster in 1936 for he had once called China his motherland. The media propaganda afterwards forced Lin to quit all political positions and moved from Taiwan to Tokyo in order to avoid further controversy. This controversy is believed to be deliberately raised by Japanese military, who tried to warn Taiwanese intellectuals about their Chinese nationalism.

Background 
In March 1936,  Lin Hsien-tang along with his brother Lin Jietang, and his son Lin Youlong visited southern China, as led by newspaper Taiwan Xinminbao. They toured Xiamen, Fuzhou, Shantou, Hong Kong, Guangdong and Shanghai. When  Lin Hsien-tang was at a welcome ceremony in Shanghai, he said, "We are finally back in our motherland." His speech was then sent to the head of Taiwan Army of Japan.

Conflict 
On 17 June 1936, the Head of Taichū Prefecture invited Lin to the ceremony in memory of Japanese rule of Taiwan at Taichū Park.

In the ceremony, a Japanese rōnin called Uruma Zenbee, who was also a right-wing activist, stopped Lin and shouted loudly, "why did you say you were back in your motherland in the ceremony where chankoros (Japanese: , literally means the slaves of Qing) welcomed you?"

The rōnin gave Lin a letter of admonishment, which demanded Lin to "1) resign as the legal consultant of the Governor and any other public positions, 2) openly apologize for mistakenly saying returning to motherland in Shanghai, 3) no longer participate in any political, cultural or societal events in the future." Then the rōnin slapped Lin in public.

Lin called the police. After the police sent this rōnin to the local prosecutor's, the court of Taihoku refused to open any lawsuit over the issue and released the rōnin.

Impact 
Japanese governor-backed newspaper Taiwan Daily News kept reporting the event and attacking Lin. Ye Rongzhong, the secretary of Lin, believed that Rippei Ogisu, the military head of colonial Taiwan, was behind the insults. Due to the overwhelming media pressure, Lin was forced to resign from the legal consultancy of the Government of colonial Taiwan, the Home Rule Alliance of Taiwan, the Common Prosperity Association of East Asia and newspaper Taiwan Minbao and moved to Tokyo with all his family of 7.

See also 

 Lin Hsien-tang
Petition Movement for the Establishment of a Taiwanese Parliament
Colonial Taiwan and the Republic of China
Chinese nationalism
Sinophobia
Anti-Chinese sentiment in Japan

References

External links
 日本浪人毆打林獻堂，製造所謂「祖國支那事件」 (in Chinese)

History of Taiwan
Taiwan under Japanese rule